Jerry Carter may refer to:
 Jerry Carter (North Carolina politician) (1955–2021)
 Jerry Carter (South Carolina politician) (born 1952)